Spinetta Fregoso (1400 in Genoa – 1467 in Gavi) was the 35th Doge of the Republic of Genoa.

Biography 
Son of Spinetta I Fregoso and Benedetta Doria, and grandson of the former Doge Pietro Fregoso, he was born in the Genoese capital in a period around 1400. Despite the fact that his father exercised the role of podestà of Pera and then later as consul in Caffa, on behalf of the Republic of Genoa, Spinetta Fregoso spent his childhood and part of his adolescence in Genoa.

The escape of the doge Prospero Adorno on July 17, 1461 led to the rise of the Fregoso as new successor of the dogal power, he appoints that of 18 July, the thirty-fifth in the history of republican Genoa, favored by the consent of the Genoese archbishop Paolo di Campofregoso. But the events that followed, among them the armed reaction of the cousin Lodovico Fregoso, soon forced the doge Spinetta to surrender and to renounce the dogate a few days later, in favor of Lodovico himself. In exchange he received the dogal investiture on the vicariate of La Spezia and Levanto.

See also 
 Republic of Genoa
 Doge of Genoa
 Fregoso

References 

15th-century Doges of Genoa

Spinetta
1400 births
1467 deaths